The Silversmith Hotel is a boutique hotel located in downtown Chicago, Illinois. It occupies the historic Silversmith Building, designed in 1896 by Peter J. Weber of the architectural firm of D.H. Burnham and Company, who also designed the Fisher Building. The building's architecture reflects the transition from Romanesque Revival architecture to Chicago school architecture. The Silversmith Building was listed on the National Register of Historic Places in 1997.

It became a member of the National Registry of the Historic Hotels of America in 2016.

See also
National Register of Historic Places listings in Chicago

References

External links
Silversmith Hotel Chicago Downtown

Hotels in Chicago
Commercial buildings on the National Register of Historic Places in Chicago
Chicago school architecture in Illinois
Historic Hotels of America